The Battle of Sarangpur was fought between Rana Kumbha and Sultan Mahmud Khilji. Mahpa Panwar, who was one of the assassins of Rana Mokal, was sheltered by the Sultan of Mandu. A demand for this person was made by Rana Kumbha, but Mahmud Khilji refused to surrender the refugee. The Rana prepared for hostilities and advanced to attack Mandu. The Sultan advanced with a powerful army to meet Kumbha.

Battle
The two armies met in A.D. 1437 and after a severe engagement, the Sultan's army was utterly routed. The Sultan fled to the refuge of his fort of Mandu. The Rana's army followed up the victory and laid siege to Mandu. When the Sultan was hard-pressed, he told Mahpa Panwar that he could keep him no longer. Mahpa thus fled to Gujarat. Kumbha stormed and took the fort. Ranmal's forces captured Sultan Mahmud Khilji, his army fleeing in all directions. The Rana returned to Chittor bringing the Sultan captive with him.

Aftermath
To commemorate this great victory, Rana Kumbha built the great Vijay Stambha(Tower of Victory) in the fortress of Chittor. However, before this tower could be completed, the Rana had to face and vanquish the combination of the two most powerful kingdoms in India at the time, those of Gujarat and Malwa, these glorious events are inscribed on the celebrated tower. Sultan Mahmud Khilji remained a prisoner in Chittor for a period of six months, after which he was liberated without ransom by Rana Kumbha.

References

History of Rajasthan
Sarangpur
Sarangpur